First Evangelical Lutheran Church (First Lutheran Church) is a historic church at 400 2nd Street in Gypsum, Colorado.
It was built in 1890 and was added to the National Register in 1993.

Iglesia Pentecostal Dios De La Montaña (Principe De Paz) is a church that started on the 2nd of May in the year 2014, here at the same First Lutheran Church.

References

Lutheran churches in Colorado
Churches on the National Register of Historic Places in Colorado
Carpenter Gothic church buildings in Colorado
Victorian architecture in Colorado
Churches completed in 1890
Buildings and structures in Eagle County, Colorado
National Register of Historic Places in Eagle County, Colorado
1890 establishments in Colorado